is a former Japanese footballer.

Club statistics
Updated to 23 February 2020.

References

External links

Profile at Fujieda MYFC

1991 births
Living people
Osaka Gakuin University alumni
Association football people from Hyōgo Prefecture
Japanese footballers
J3 League players
Gainare Tottori players
Fujieda MYFC players
Ococias Kyoto AC players
Association football midfielders